Fiegert is a German surname. Notable people with the surname include:

 Anna Fiegert (born 1994), German ice hockey player
 Elfie Fiegert (born 1946), German actor
 Nigel Fiegert (born 1976), Australian Australian rules football player

German-language surnames